Edward Hopkinson (29 October 1935  –  25 April 2004) was an English football goalkeeper.
He was born in Wheatley Hill, near Peterlee, County Durham.

During his club career he played for Oldham Athletic and Bolton Wanderers, the latter from August 1952 to November 1969, where he holds the club record for appearances (578 matches). He earned 14 caps for the England national football team from 1957 to 1959, and was England's reserve goalkeeper at the 1958 FIFA World Cup. He also won 6 Under-23 caps for England. In 1958 he won an FA Cup winners medal, keeping a clean sheet against Manchester United. He was an assistant trainer at Bolton Wanderers until he became assistant manager at Stockport County in 1974. He later worked for a chemical company as a company representative. Eusebio played in his 1971 testimonial game. He also was manager for Ashton United.

References

1935 births
2004 deaths
Association football goalkeepers
English footballers
England international footballers
England under-23 international footballers
1958 FIFA World Cup players
Bolton Wanderers F.C. players
Oldham Athletic A.F.C. players
Ashton United F.C. players
Bolton Wanderers F.C. non-playing staff
Stockport County F.C. non-playing staff 
English Football League players
People from Wheatley Hill
Footballers from County Durham
English Football League representative players
English football managers
Stockport County F.C. managers
FA Cup Final players